Riccardo Melgrati (born 17 June 1994) is an Italian footballer who plays as a goalkeeper for  club Lecco.

Club career

Inter Milan
Born in Monza, Lombardy, Melgrati started his career at Lombard club Inter Milan. He completed with fellow youth player Francesco Anacoura from 2004 to 2008 (left for Pavia), Raffaele Dalle Vedove from 2008 to 2012 (Melgrati left Inter) as well as Matteo Cincilla from 2009 to 2012 (ditto.). The players were the member the under-18 team for Berretti League in 2011–12 season. They also training with the reserve team in summer 2010, as Raffaele Di Gennaro and Alberto Gallinetta were trained with the first team. Melgrati and Cincilla also played for the reserve team (under-19 team) in 2011–12 season (3 times each), due to the injury of Di Gennaro and Andrea Sala. Moreover, Melgrati was the fifth goalkeeper for Inter in 2011–12 UEFA Champions League as List B player (de facto the fourth after the injury of Di Gennaro; Tornaghi and Viviano were not in the European squad). Melgrati was the backup for Cincilla and Dalle Vedove in Berretti League finals in May 2012; Melgrati did not receive call-up to the reserve league finals in June 2012.

Cesena
On 23 August 2012 Melgrati was signed by Serie B club Cesena in co-ownership deal for €500, in 2-year contract. Melgrati was the first choice of the reserve team, ahead Marco Quadrelli and overage player Emmanuel Pontet. Melgrati also wore no.33 for the first team. In June 2013 Melgrati was acquired by Cesena outright for €750,000. Cesena had also signed 50% "card" of Thomas Pedrabissi for another €1 million; 50% "card" of Yago Del Piero for €750,000; Inter bought back Luca Caldirola for €2.5 million. Inter had sold Cincilla (January 2013), Melgrati (June 2013) outright successively and Dalle Vedove in co-ownership (in July) within a year.

Como (loan)
On 11 July 2013 Melgrati left for Como in temporary deal from Cesena.

Südtirol (loan)
On 26 July 2014 he was signed by Südtirol. Before he left the club he wore no.94 shirt for Cesena.

Pro Vercelli (loan)
On 30 July 2015 he was signed by Pro Vercelli in a temporary deal.

Prato (loan) 
In the summer of 2016 goes on loan to Prato.

Siena
On 24 January 2019, he signed with Siena until the end of the 2018–19 season.

Return to Arezzo
On 30 January 2021, he returned to Arezzo.

Imolese
On 24 September 2021, he signed with Imolese.

Pontedera
On 31 January 2022, Melgrati moved to Pontedera.

Lecco
On 15 July 2022, Melgrati joined Lecco.

International career
Melgrati played twice for the Italy U17 side in 2011 UEFA European Under-17 Championship qualification, ahead Luca Lezzerini. Pasquale Salerno used Alessio Cragno and Lezzerini in the next stage of qualification. Melgrati was recalled in March 2013 for Italy U19 team for a friendly. He was the third keeper in 2013 UEFA European Under-19 Championship elite qualification, behind Cragno and Pierluigi Gollini.

References

External links
 

1994 births
Living people
Sportspeople from Monza
Footballers from Lombardy
Italian footballers
Association football goalkeepers
Serie B players
Serie C players
Inter Milan players
A.C. Cesena players
Como 1907 players
F.C. Südtirol players
F.C. Pro Vercelli 1892 players
A.C. Prato players
S.S. Arezzo players
A.C.N. Siena 1904 players
Imolese Calcio 1919 players
U.S. Città di Pontedera players
Calcio Lecco 1912 players
Segunda División B players
AE Prat players
Italy youth international footballers
Italian expatriate footballers
Italian expatriate sportspeople in Spain
Expatriate footballers in Spain